The 2021 Arlington mayoral election was held on May 1, 2021 to decide the mayor of Arlington, Texas. Incumbent mayor Jeff Williams retired due to term limits. A runoff was held on June 5, 2021 between Jim Ross and Michael Glaspie after no candidate received a majority of the vote in the nonpartisan primary election.

Candidates 
The filing date for candidates was February 12, 2021.

Advanced to runoff 
Michael Glaspie, former member of the Arlington City Council (2012-2019)
Jim Ross, attorney and businessman

Eliminated 
Doni Anthony, sales representative and activist
Kelly Burke, business owner
Cirilo Ocampo, Jr., information systems specialist
Marvin Sutton, former member of the Arlington City Council (2019-2021)
Dewayne Washington, pastor

Disqualified from ballot 
Jerry Warden, agent

Results

References 

Arlington
Arlington
Mayoral elections in Arlington, Texas
Non-partisan elections